Mahadev Ghurhu is a town in the Siddharth Nagar district of the state of Uttar Pradesh, India.

The nearest railway station is Barhni which is 25 kilometers from Mahadev Ghurhu. It is on the Gonda-Gorakhpur loop line and is being converted into broad gauge line. Another nearby railway station is at Basti,  which is well connected to Delhi, Mumbai, Lucknow, Gorakhpur etc.

References

Cities and towns in Siddharthnagar district